The following lists events that occurred in 2018 in Azerbaijan.

Incumbents
 President: Ilham Aliyev

 Vice President: Mehriban Aliyeva
 Prime Minister: Artur Rasizade (until 21 April), Novruz Mammadov (starting 21 April)

Events

February

March

April

May

June

September

October

November

Gallery

References 

 
2010s in Azerbaijan
Years of the 21st century in Azerbaijan
Azerbaijan
Azerbaijan
Azerbaijan